Criticism of democracy has been a key part of democracy and its functions. As Josiah Ober explains, "the legitimate role of critics" of democracy may be difficult to define, but one "approach is to divide critics into 'good internal' critics (those who call upon the constitutional regime to be true to its own highest principles) and 'bad external' critics who reject the values embraced and nurtured by constitutional democracy."

Since classical antiquity and through the modern era, democracy has been associated with "rule by the people," "rule by the majority," and free selection or election, either through direct participation or elected representation, respectively.

Political thinkers have approached critiques of democratic political systems from different perspectives. Many times it is not necessary to oppose democracy by its simplest definition – "rule by the people" – but, rather, seek to question or expand this popular definition. In their work, they distinguish between democratic principles that are effectively implemented through undemocratic procedures; undemocratic principles that are implemented through democratic procedures; and variations of the same kind. For instance, some critics of democracy would agree with Winston Churchill's famous remark, "No one pretends that democracy is perfect or all-wise. Indeed, it has been said that democracy is the worst form of government except all those other forms that have been tried from time to time." Other critics may be more prepared to describe existing democratic regimes as anything but "rule by the people."

Leading contemporary thinkers in critical democratic theory include Jürgen Habermas, Robert A. Dahl, Robert E. Goodin, Bernard Manin, Joseph Schumpeter, James S. Fishkin, Ian Shapiro, Jason Brennan, Hélène Landemore, and Hans-Hermann Hoppe.

Critics of democracy have often tried to highlight democracy's inconsistencies, paradoxes, and limits by contrasting it with other forms of governments such as epistocracy, plural voting, or lottocrative alternatives. They have characterized most modern democracies as democratic polyarchies and democratic aristocracies; they have identified fascist moments in modern democracies; they have termed the societies produced by modern democracies as neo-feudal; while yet others have contrasted democracy with fascism, anarcho-capitalism, theocracy, and absolute monarchy. The most widely known critics of democracy include Plato and the authors of the Federalist Papers, who were interested in establishing a representative democracy in the early United States instead of a direct democracy.  The authors of the Federalist papers explained why the Constitution was based on a certain type of democracy, also called an American republic or liberal democracy.

Additional historical figures associated with the critique of democracy include Aristotle, Plato, Montesquieu, James Harrington, Jean-Jacques Rousseau, Thomas Carlyle, John Ruskin, Martin Heidegger, Hubert Lagardelle, Charles Maurras, Friedrich Nietzsche, Carl Schmitt, Oswald Spengler, Erik von Kuehnelt-Leddihn, Nicolás Gómez Dávila, and Elazar Menachem Shach.

Some critiques have improved democracy, such as those of Plato and Aristotle, who some scholars believe laid the foundation for modern constitutional democracy.

History of Criticism

Classical antiquity 

As Robert Dahl writes, "Although the practices of modern democracy bear only a weak resemblance to the political institutions of classical Greece...Greek democratic ideas have been more influential...[and] what we know of their ideas comes less from the writings and speeches of democratic advocates, of which only fragments survive, than from their critics." 

Aristotle was a mild critic "who disliked the power that he thought the expansion of democracy necessarily gave to the poor." Plato was an opponent of democracy who advocated for "government by the best qualified." Modern liberal democracy incorporated some of these critiques. For example, James Madison "trained rigorously in...ancient learning" as a young man, and the ideas of ancient authors explain a "facet of Madison's recorded attitude on the nature of man." The influence of the ancient critiques of democracy is seen in how Madison spent the months before the Constitutional Convention "studying many centuries of political philosophy and histories of past attempts at republican forms of government."

According to Dahl, Aristotle and Plato would agree with most advocates of modern democracy that an aim of society is "to produce good citizens" and "Virtue, justice, and happiness are companions...[in] developing citizens who seek the common good."

Thucydides, the famous ancient Greek historian of the Peloponnesian War, witnessed the fall of Athenian democracy and applied scientific history in his critique of the democratic government. At the heart of his critique were how democracy failed "in the search for truth" and how leaders and citizens attempted "to impose their own speech-dependent meanings on reality." Thucydides blamed "public orators" and demagogues for a failure of epistemic knowledge, allowing most Athenians to "believe silly things about their own past and the institutions of their opponents."

Confucius greatly influenced East Asian societies over time, and political leaders  in Singapore and China today often say Confucianism provides a more "coherent ideological basis for a well-ordered Asian society than Western notions of individual liberty." Nonetheless, East Asian countries employ forms of Democracy and Communism, political systems developed in the West.  The notion of "well-ordered Asian" society is more compatible with Communism, employed by China and Vietnam,  both rapidly growing and globalized economies in the 21st century, but also in North Korea which follows isolationism which hampers the improvement of lives of average citizens.

Post-classical period 
From 500-1500 AD, philosophers and political leaders around the world often advocated for traditional systems of governing society, which were critical of democracy.

Italian philosopher and theologian Thomas Aquinas advocated for "a mixed government combining elements of democracy, aristocracy and kingship...[which] is reminiscent of Aristotle’s preference for mixed government over either democracy or oligarchy." Scholars also consider "the substantial medieval literature in support of the Inquisitions" as opposed to modern ideas of democracy.

Democracy existed in a few "city-states of medieval Italy...[which] were ultimately submerged in imperial or oligarchic rule." The idea of "representation was not invented by democrats but developed instead as a medieval institution of monarchical and aristocratic government," and had its beginnings in "assemblies summoned by monarch, or sometimes the nobles themselves, to deal with important matters of state." The "state of military technology and organization" in medieval Europe was "highly unfavorable in its effects" on democracy.

Medieval Jewish political philosophy was influenced by Plato, Muslim thought, and halakhic concepts and was "monarchist, and inherently anti-democratic."

As Amartya Sen wrote about traditional Asian societies, "It is not hard, of course, to find authoritarian writings within the Asian traditions. But neither is it hard to find them in Western classics: One has only to reflect on the writings of Plato or Aquinas to see that devotion to discipline is not a special Asian taste."

Since the post-classical period, Islam has been an important pillar of society for much of the world, and some critics have defended this tradition from "the secular assumptions of the Enlightenment" and an "uncritical universalism," which "erodes historical continuity and the sense of community that sustains traditional societies." In many societies today, people of faith challenge the idea of "secularism as the only 'rational' way to deal with the challenges of life."

Early modern period 
Thomas Hobbes, one of the first philosophers of the Enlightenment, published Leviathan in 1651 in defense of "absolute sovereignty" and supporting the royalists in the English Civil War. Hobbes was a critic of democracy because "the sovereign in a democracy (i.e. the people) can only exercise its power when it is actually assembled together...Only in a monarchy is the capacity to govern always exercised." Hobbes also thought democracy would lead to instability, conflict, glory seeking, mistrust, and undermining the social contract. Later Enlightenment thinkers, such as Madison who shared Hobbesian concerns about "the strongest passions and most dangerous weaknesses" of human nature, would use some of these critiques to improve modern democracy.

Romantic era 
Romantic critics of democracy include Thomas Carlyle, John Ruskin, Matthew Arnold, James Fitzjames Stephen, Henry Maine, and William Lecky. In his study, Benjamin Evans Lippincott wrote that "they opposed democracy fundamentally for the same reason as Plato—that democracy led to disorder." Their contribution was to critique democracy under capitalism in modern industrial society. They believed that democracy produced anarchy in society, not simply anarchy within the individual as Plato believed.

Lippincott proposed that their three leading doctrines were "the common man's inferiority, the title of the few to rule, and authority". The main sources of these ideas were puritanism, middle-class ideas of power, and the classical education that they received in their youth. The three doctrines were "most perfectly represented in Plato's Republic", while classical history seemed to provide examples of "the common man's inferiority" as in the cases of Athens and Rome, "which showed the populace turning to disorder". The three doctrines were developed during the Reformation and the Enlightenment by writers like John Calvin, Edmund Burke and David Hume.

Criticism of Purpose

Benefits of a specialized society
Plato believed it's reckless to allow common men to vote because the vote of an expert has equal value to the vote of an incompetent.

One such argument is that the benefits of a specialized society may be compromised by democracy. As ordinary citizens are encouraged to take part in the political life of the country, they have the power to directly influence the outcome of government policies through the democratic procedures of voting, campaigning and the use of press. The result is that government policies may be more influenced by non-specialist opinions and thereby the effectiveness compromised, especially if a policy is very technically sophisticated and/or the general public inadequately informed. For example, there is no guarantee that those who campaign about the government's economic policies are themselves professional economists or academically competent in this particular discipline, regardless of whether they were well-educated. Essentially this means that a democratic government may not be providing the most good for the largest number of people. However, some have argued that this should not even be the goal of democracies because the minority could be seriously mistreated under that purported goal.

Rule of the aristocratic

Manin 
The real difference between ancient democracies and modern republics lies, according to Madison, in "the total exclusion of the people in their collective capacity from any share in the latter, and not in the total exclusion of the representatives of the people from the administration of the former.— Bernard Manin, p. 2 (See: Madison, "Federalist 63," in The Federalist Papers, p. 387; Madison's emphasis.)Bernard Manin is interested in distinguishing modern representative republics, such as the United States, from ancient direct democracies, such as Athens. Manin believes that both aspire to "rule of the people," but that the nature of modern representative republics leads them to "rule of the aristocratic." Manin explains that in ancient democracies, virtually every citizen had the chance to be selected to populate the government but in modern republics, only elites have the chance of being elected. He does not defend this phenomenon but rather seeks to describe it.

Manin draws from James Harrington, Montesquieu, and Jean-Jacques Rousseau to suggest that the dominant form of government, representative as opposed to direct, is effectively aristocratic. He proposes that modern representative governments exercise political power through aristocratic elections which, in turn, brings into question democracy's "rule of the people" principle. As far as Montesquieu is concerned, elections favor the "best" citizens who Manin notes tend to be wealthy and upper-class. As far as Rousseau is concerned, elections favor the incumbent government officials or the citizens with the strongest personalities, which results in hereditary aristocracy. Manin further evinces the aristocratic nature of representative governments by contrasting them with the ancient style of selection by lot. Manin notes that Montesquieu believed that lotteries prevent jealousy and distribute offices equally (among citizens from different ranks), while Rousseau believed that lotteries choose indifferently, preventing self-interest and partiality from polluting the citizen's choice (and thus prevent hereditary aristocracy).

However, Manin also provides criticism of direct democracy, or selection by lot. Manin reflects on Montesquieu's interrogation of the extent to which Athenian direct democracy was truly direct. Montesquieu finds that citizens who had reason to believe they would be accused as "unworthy of selection" commonly withheld their names from the lottery, thereby making selection by lot vulnerable to self-selection bias and, thus, aristocratic in nature. Manin does not dwell on direct democracy's potentially aristocratic elements, perhaps because he shares Montesquieu's belief that there is nothing alarming about the exclusion of citizens who may be incompetent; this exclusion may be inevitable in any method of selection.

Additionally, Manin is interested in explaining the discrepancy between 18th century American and French revolutionaries' declaration of the "equality of all citizens" and their enactment of (aristocratic) elections in their respective democratic experiments. Manin suggests that the discrepancy is explained by the revolutionaries' contemporary preoccupation with one form of equality over another. The revolutionaries prioritized gaining the equal right to consent to their choice of government (even a potentially aristocratic democracy), at the expense of seeking the equal right to be face of that democracy. And it is elections, not lots, that provide citizens with more opportunities to consent. In elections, citizens consent both to the procedure of elections and to the product of the elections (even if they produce the election of elites). In lotteries, citizens consent only to the procedure of lots, but not to the product of the lots (even if they produce election of the average person). That is, if the revolutionaries prioritized consent to be governed over equal opportunity to serve as the government, then their choice of elections over lotteries makes sense.

Michels
A major scholarly attack on the basis of democracy was made by German-Italian political scientist Robert Michels who developed the mainstream political science theory of the iron law of oligarchy in 1911. Michels argued that oligarchy is inevitable as an "iron law" within any organization as part of the "tactical and technical necessities" of organization and on the topic of democracy, Michels stated: "It is organization which gives birth to the dominion of the elected over the electors, of the mandataries over the mandators, of the delegates over the delegators. Who says organization, says oligarchy" and went on to state "Historical evolution mocks all the prophylactic measures that have been adopted for the prevention of oligarchy." Michels stated that the official goal of democracy of eliminating elite rule was impossible, that democracy is a façade legitimizing the rule of a particular elite, and that elite rule, that he refers to as oligarchy, is inevitable. Michels had formerly been a Marxist but became drawn to the syndicalism of Sorel, Eduoard Berth, Arturo Labriola, and Enrico Leone and had become strongly opposed parliamentarian, legalistic, and bureaucratic socialism of social democracy and in contrast supported an activist, voluntarist, anti-parliamentarian socialism. Michels would later become a supporter of fascism upon Mussolini's rise to power in 1922, viewing fascism's goal to destroy liberal democracy in a sympathetic manner.

Maurras
Charles Maurras, an FRS member of the Action française movement, stated in a famous dictum "Democracy is evil, democracy is death." Maurras' concept of politique naturelle declared recognition of inescapable biological inequality and thereby natural hierarchies, and claimed that the individual is naturally subordinated to social collectivities such as the family, the society, and the state, which he claims are doomed to fail if based upon the "myth of equality" or "abstract liberty". Maurras criticized democracy as being a "government by numbers" in which quantity matters more over quality and prefers the worst over the best. Maurras denounced the principles of liberalism as described in The Social Contract by Jean-Jacques Rousseau and in Declaration of the Rights of Man and of the Citizen as based upon the false assumption of liberty and the false assumption of equality. He claimed that the parliamentary system subordinates the national interest, or common good, to private interests of a parliament's representatives where only short-sighted interests of individuals prevail.

Brennan 
American contemporary philosopher Jason Brennan has similar remarks against democratic governments. Brennan's main argument opposing democracies is the issue of voter ignorance and voter irrationality.  Brennan claims that "the democratic system incentivizes them [voting aged citizens] to be ignorant (or more precisely, fails to incentivize them [voting aged citizens] to be informed)". Throughout Brennan's book, Against Democracy, he explains the various issues with voter incompetence and proposed an alternative system of government known as an epistocracy.

Lagardelle
French revolutionary syndicalist Hubert Lagardelle claimed that French revolutionary syndicalism came to being as the result of "the reaction of the proletariat against idotic democracy," which he claimed was "the popular form of bourgeois dominance." Lagardelle opposed democracy for its universalism, and believed in the necessity of class separation of the proletariat from the bourgeoisie, as democracy did not recognize the social differences between them.

Shach
Israeli politician Rabbi Elazar Menachem Shach promoted Judaic law to be the natural governance for Jews and condemned "Democracy as a machinery of lies, false notions, pursuit of narrow interests and deceit - as opposed to the Torah regime, which is based on seeking the ultimate truth." Shach criticized democracy for having no real goals, saying "The whole point of democracy is money. The one does what the other asks him to do in pursuit of his own interest, so as to be given what he himself asks for, and the whole purpose of the transaction is that each would get what they want."

Criticism of Process

Political instability

More recently, democracy is criticized for not offering enough political stability. As governments are frequently elected on and off there tend to be frequent changes in the policies of democratic countries both domestically and internationally. Even if a political party maintains power, vociferous, headline grabbing protests and harsh criticism from the mass media are often enough to force sudden, unexpected political change. Frequent policy changes with regard to business and immigration are likely to deter investment and so hinder economic growth. For this reason, many people have put forward the idea that democracy is undesirable for a developing country in which economic growth and the reduction of poverty are top priority. However, Anthony Downs argued that the political market works much the same way as the economic market, and that there could potentially be an equilibrium in the system because of democratic process. However, he eventually argued that imperfect knowledge in politicians and voters prevented the reaching of that equilibrium.

Short-termism
Democracy is also criticised for frequent elections due to the instability of coalition governments. Coalitions are frequently formed after the elections in many countries (for example India) and the basis of alliance is predominantly to enable a viable majority, not an ideological concurrence.

This opportunist alliance not only has the handicap of having to cater to too many ideologically opposing factions, but it is usually short lived since any perceived or actual imbalance in the treatment of coalition partners, or changes to leadership in the coalition partners themselves, can very easily result in the coalition partner withdrawing its support from the government.

Democratic institutions work on consensus to decide an issue, which usually takes longer than a unilateral decision.

M. S. Golwalkar, in his book Bunch of Thoughts, describes democracy as, "is to a very large extent only a myth in practice...The high-sounding concept of 'individual freedom' only meant the freedom of those talented few to exploit the rest."

Corruption
The inability of governments around the world to successfully deal with corruption is causing a global crisis of democracy. Whilst countries that have high levels of democracy tend to have low levels of different forms of corruption, it is also clear that countries with moderate levels of democracy have high corruption, as well as countries with no democracy having very little corruption. Varying types of democratic policies reduce corruption, but only high levels of, and multiple kinds of democratic institutions, such as open and free elections combined with judicial and legislative constraints, will effectively reduce corruption. One important internal element of democracy is the electoral process which can be considered easily corruptible. For example, it is not inevitable in a democracy that elections will be free and fair. The giving and receiving of bribes, the threat or use of violence, treating and impersonation are common ways that the electoral process can be corrupted, meaning that democracy is not impenetrable from external problems and can be criticised for allowing it to take place.

Voter Ignorance 
Jason Brennan believes that voter ignorance is a major problem in America and is the main objection to democracies in general. Brennan states that “less than 30% of Americans can name two or more of the rights listed in the First Amendment of the Bill of Rights”. Naturally, this creates a problem because an ignorant vote counts for the exact same as an informed vote. In order to be an informed voter one must have extensive knowledge of the candidate’s current and previous political beliefs/tendencies, according to Brennan. Additionally, Brennan would claim that to truly be an informed voter one must be educated in other disciplines outside of politics – for instance, history and economics. The standard in which Brennan places on voters is significantly high; it is understandable that most Americans do not meet these expectations.

While most Americans fall short of these expectations, the cause of voter ignorance is not due to a lack of intelligence. Rather voters are simply rationally ignorant and rationally irrational. Firstly, rational ignorance means that voters are logical and/or reasonable for staying uninformed about politics. This is because to become an informed voter, according to Brennan's standards, it would be extremely cost-prohibitive to the individual. It would take an enormous amount of time to become informed to such a level and stay informed about current political events. When doing a cost-benefit analysis, most people would find that becoming informed is not worth their time. There are other alternatives that would be more worth the individual’s time/effort. Therefore, people are considered rational for choosing not to be informed. Secondly, rational irrationality refers to the fact that it is logical for people to have cognitive biases resulting in irrational beliefs. Similar to why it is rational for voters to be ignorant, the cost-benefit analysis to correct cognitive biases is not in favor of the informed voter. Brennan claims that “just as it is instrumentally rational for most people to remain ignorant about politics, it is instrumentally rational for most of them to indulge their biases”. The costs outweigh the benefits because it would take an excessive amount of work to find neutral/fair information and correct one’s own biases. In both cases, voters remain ignorant and irrational because the costs to become an impartial, informed voter do not outweigh the benefits. The impact of a competent vote is futile. In the grand scheme of things, a single vote amounts for very little. The chances that one’s vote would be the deciding factor in the election is minuscule; therefore, why would one take the time to inform themselves with very little reward? One could spend an abundance of time becoming informed and rational only to result in the same outcome.

Potential incompatibility with former politics 
The new establishment of democratic institutions, in countries where the associated practices have as yet been uncommon or deemed culturally unacceptable, can result in institutions that are not sustainable in the long term. One circumstance supporting this outcome may be when it is part of the common perception among the populace that the institutions were established as a direct result of foreign pressure.

Sustained regular inspection from democratic countries, however effortful and well-meaning, are normally not sufficient in preventing the erosion of democratic practices. In the cases of several African countries, corruption still is rife in spite of democratically elected governments, as one of the most severe examples, Zimbabwe, is often perceived to have backfired into outright militarism.

Efficiency of the system
Economists, such as Meltzer and Richard, have added that as industrial activity in a democracy increases, so too do the people's demands for subsidies and support from the government. By the median voter theorem, only a few people actually hold the balance of power in the country, and many may be unhappy with their decisions. In this way, they argue, democracies are inefficient.

Such a system could result in a wealth disparity or racial discrimination. Fierlbeck (1998) points out that such a result is not necessarily due to a failing in the democratic process, but rather, "because democracy is responsive to the desires of a large middle class increasingly willing to disregard the muted voices of economically marginalized groups within its own borders." The will of the democratic majority may not always be in the best interest of all citizens.

Susceptibility to propaganda

Lack of political education

Voters may not be educated enough to exercise their democratic rights prudently. Politicians may take advantage of voters' irrationality, and compete more in the field of public relations and tactics, than in ideology. While arguments against democracy are often taken by advocates of democracy as an attempt to maintain or revive traditional hierarchy and autocratic rule, many extensions have been made to develop the argument further. In Lipset's 1959 essay about the requirements for forming democracy, he found that almost all emerging democracies provided good education. However, education alone cannot sustain a democracy, though Caplan did note in 2005 that as people become educated, they think more like economists. To legitimize this point, it is often mentioned that German dictator Adolf Hitler rose to power by democratic means.

Manipulation or control of public opinion 

Politicians and special interests have attempted to manipulate public opinion for as long as recorded history − this has put into question the feasibility of democratic government. Critics claim that mass media actually shapes public opinion, and can therefore be used to "control" democracy. Opinion polls before the election are under special criticism. Furthermore, the disclosure of reputation-damaging material shortly before elections may be used to significantly manipulate public opinion. In the United States the FBI was criticized for announcing that the agency would examine potentially incriminating evidence against Hillary Clinton's use of a private email server just 11 days before the election. It has been said that misinformation − such as fake news − has become central to elections around the world. In December 2016 United States' intelligence agencies have concluded that Russia worked "to undermine public faith in the U.S. democratic process, denigrate Secretary [Hillary] Clinton, and harm her electability and potential presidency" − including passing material against the Democrats to WikiLeaks to discredit the election and favor Donald Trump. Social bots and other forms of online propaganda as well as search engine result algorithms may be used to alter the perception and opinion of voters. In 2016 Andrés Sepúlveda disclosed that he manipulated public opinion to rig elections in Latin America. According to him, with a budget of $600,000, he led a team of hackers that stole campaign strategies, manipulated social media to create false waves of enthusiasm and derision, and installed spyware in opposition offices to help Enrique Peña Nieto, a right-of-center candidate, win the election. This highlights that a significant criticism of democracy is that voters can be so easily manipulated.

Manipulation of the opposition

Various reasons can be found for eliminating or suppressing political opponents. Methods such as false flags, counterterrorism-laws, planting or creating compromising material and perpetuation of public fear may be used to suppress dissent. After a failed coup d'état over 110,000 people have been purged and nearly 40,000 have been imprisoned in Turkey, which is or was considered to be a democratic nation, during the 2016 Turkish purges.

Fake parties, phantom political rivals and "scarecrow" opponents may be used to undermine the opposition.

Information Overload Paradox

Too much information, as common in the present digital age, where people are deluged by information through newspapers, daily television, social media and various other forms, is called information overload. This creates a situation in democracies where people are too fatigued to process all this information intelligently or incompetent or unwilling to do so, for various reasons.

Limited responsiveness and representation 
Robert A. Dahl defines democracies as systems of government that respond nearly fully to each and every one of their citizens. He then poses that no such, fully responsive system exists today. However, this does not mean that partially democratic regimes do not exist—they do. Thus, Dahl rejects a democracy dichotomy in favor of a democratization spectrum. To Dahl, the question is not whether a country is a democracy or not. The question is to what extent a country is experiencing democratization at a national level. Dahl measures this democratization in terms of the country's endorsement and reception of public contestation. And polyarchy, or "rule of the many people," is the only existing form of democratizeable government; that is, it is within polyarchies that democratization can flourish. Countries do not immediately transform from hegemonies and competitive oligarchies into democracies. Instead, a country that adopts democracy as its form of government can only claim to have switched to polyarchy, which is conducive to, but does not guarantee, democratization. Dahl's polyarchy spectrum ends at the point in which a country becomes a full polyarchy at the national level and begins to democratize at the subnational level, among its social and private affairs. Dahl is not deeply concerned about the limits of his polyarchy spectrum because he believes that most countries today still have a long way before they reach full polyarchy status. For Dahl, whatever lies beyond full polyarchy is only possible, and thus only a concern, for advanced countries like those of Western Europe.

Excessive reliance on procedural formalities 
The Chinese Communist Party political concept of whole process people's democracy criticizes liberal democracy for excessively relying on procedural formalities without genuinely reflecting the interests of the people. Under this primarily consequentialist concept, the most important criteria for a democracy is whether it can "solve the people's real problems," while a system in which "the people are awakened only for voting" is not truly democratic. For example, the Chinese government's 2021 white paper China: Democracy that Works criticizes liberal democracy's shortcoming based on principles of whole process people's democracy.

Criticism of Outcome

Mob rule

Plato's Republic presents a critical view of democracy through the narration of Socrates: "foolish leaders of Democracy, which is a charming form of government, full of variety and disorder, and dispensing a sort of equality to equals and unequaled alike." In his work, Plato lists 5 forms of government from best to worst. Assuming that the Republic was intended to be a serious critique of the political thought in Athens, Plato argues that only Kallipolis, an aristocracy led by the unwilling philosopher-kings (the wisest men), is a just form of government.

Plato rejected Athenian democracy on the basis that such democracies were anarchic societies without internal unity, that they followed citizens' impulses rather than pursuing the common good, that democracies are unable to allow a sufficient number of their citizens to have their voices heard, and that such democracies were typically run by fools. Plato attacked Athenian democracies for mistaking anarchy for freedom. The lack of coherent unity in Athenian democracy made Plato conclude that such democracies were a mere collection of individuals occupying a common space rather than a form of political organization.

According to Plato, other forms of government place too much focus on lesser virtues and degenerate into other forms from best to worst, starting with timocracy, which overvalues honour, then oligarchy, which overvalues wealth, which is followed by democracy. In democracy, the oligarchs, or merchant, are unable to wield their power effectively and the people take over, electing someone who plays on their wishes (for example, by throwing lavish festivals). However, the government grants the people too much freedom, and the state degenerates into the fourth form, tyranny, or mob rule.

John T. Wenders, a professor of economics at the University of Idaho, writes:

If we base our critique on the definition of democracy as governance based on the will of the majority, there can be some foreseeable consequences to this form of rule. For example, Fierlbeck (1998: 12) points out that the middle class majority in a country may decide to redistribute wealth and resources into the hands of those that they feel are most capable of investing or increasing them. Of course this is only a critique of a subset of types of democracy that primarily use majority rule.

US President James Madison devoted the whole of Federalist No. 10 to a scathing critique of democracy and offered that republics are a far better solution, saying: "...democracies have ever been spectacles of turbulence and contention; have ever been found incompatible with personal security or the rights of property; and have in general been as short in their lives as they have been violent in their deaths." Madison offered that republics were superior to democracies because republics safeguarded against tyranny of the majority, stating in Federalist No. 10: "the same advantage which a republic has over a democracy, in controlling the effects of faction, is enjoyed by a large over a small republic".

Professors Richard Ellis of Willamette University and Michael Nelson of Rhodes College argue that much constitutional thought, from Madison to Lincoln and beyond, has focused on "the problem of majority tyranny." They conclude, "The principles of republican government embedded in the Constitution represent an effort by the framers to ensure that the inalienable rights of life, liberty, and the pursuit of happiness would not be trampled by majorities." Thomas Jefferson warned that "an elective despotism is not the government we fought for."  A constitution would limit the powers of what a simple majority can accomplish.

Cyclical theory of government
Machiavelli put the idea that democracies will tend to cater to the whims of the people, who follow false ideas to entertain themselves, squander their reserves, and do not deal with potential threats to their rule until it is far too late.

However Machiavelli's definition of democracy was narrower than the current one. He hypothesized that a hybrid system of government incorporating facets of all three major types (monarchy, aristocracy and democracy) could break this cycle. Many modern democracies that have separation of powers are claimed to represent these kinds of hybrid governments. However, in modern democracies there is usually no direct correlation with Machiavelli's idea, because of weakening of the separation of powers, or erosion of the original function of the various branches. For example, the modern United States executive branch has slowly accumulated more power from the legislative branch, and the Senate no longer functions as a quasi-aristocratic body as was originally intended, since senators are now democratically elected.

Political Coase theorem
Some have tried to argue that the Coase theorem applies to political markets as well. Daron Acemoglu, however, provides evidence to the contrary, claiming that the Coase Theorem is only valid while there are "rules of the game," so to speak, that are being enforced by the government. But when there is nobody there to enforce the rules for the government itself, there is no way to guarantee that low transaction costs will lead to an efficient outcome in democracies.

Criticism of Logical Coherence
For several centuries, scholars have studied voting inconsistencies, also called voting paradoxes. These studies have culminated in Arrow's impossibility theorem, which suggests that democracy is logically incoherent. This is based on a certain set of criteria for democratic decision-making being inherently conflicting. This situation was metaphorically characterized by Charles Plott:

Alternatives to Democracy 
Jason Brennan, the author of Against Democracy, discredits the democratic system and proposes an alternative form of government known as an epistocracy. Instead of giving everyone the right to vote, an epistocratic system would only give a vote to those that are competent. Only citizens with an elite political understanding would have a say in government. Brennan’s whole argument in preferring an epistocracy to a democracy revolves around the issue of voter ignorance. Brennan believes that voter ignorance is a major problem in America and is the main objection to democracies in general.

Religious Criticism

Islam 

The practice of orthodox Islam in the form of Salafism can clash with a democratic system. The core precept of Islam, that of "tawheed", (the "oneness of God"), can be interpreted by fundamentalists to mean, among other things, that democracy as a political system is incompatible with the purported notion that laws not handed down by God should not be recognized.

See also

References

Further reading

 Benoist, Alain de. The Problem of Democracy, Arktos Media, 2011.
 Blackie, John Stuart. On Democracy, Edmond & Douglas. Edinburgh, 1867.
 Brennan, Jason. Against Democracy, 2016. 
 Briggs, Asa. “Robert Lowe and the Fear of Democracy," in Briggs, Victorian People (1955) pp. pp. 232–263. online in late 19th century British politics
 Brownson, Orestes. "Democracy and Liberty," Democratic Review, April 1843.
 Carlyle, Thomas. "The Present Time." In Latter-Day Pamphlets, 1850.
 Coomaraswamy, Ananda K. "The Bugbear of Democracy, Freedom, and Equality," Studies in Comparative Religion, Vol. 11, No. 3, Summer, 1977.
 Femia, Joseph. Against the Masses, Oxford University Press, 2001.
 Godkin, Edwin L. Problems of Modern Democracy, Charles Scribner's Sons. New York, 1896.
 Godkin, Edwin L. Unforeseen Tendencies of Democracy, Houghton, Mifflin and Company. Boston, 1898.
 Graham, Gordon. The Case Against the Democratic State: An Essay in Cultural Criticism, Imprint Academic, 2002.
 Hoppe, Hans-Hermann. Democracy: The God That Failed, Transaction Publishers, Rutgers, N.J., 2001.
 Karsten, Frank. Beyond Democracy, 2012.
 Kofmel, Erich (ed). Anti-Democratic Thought, Charlottesville, Virginia, USA: Imprint Academic, 2008.
 Kuehnelt-Leddihn, Erik von. Liberty or Equality, The Caxton Printers, 1952.
 Lukacs, John. Democracy and Populism: Fear and Hatred, Yale University Press, 2005.
 Ludovici, Anthony M. The False Assumptions of "Democracy," Heath Cranton, Ltd. London, 1921.
 Mackinder, Sir Halford J. Democratic Ideals and Reality, Henry Holt & Company. New York, 1919.
 Maine, Sir Henry Sumner. Popular Government, John Murray. London, 1886.
 Mallock, William H. The Limits of Pure Democracy, Chapman & Hall. London, 1918.
 Mann, Michael. The Dark Side of Democracy: Explaining Ethnic Cleansing, Cambridge University Press, 2004.
Notes on Democracy,, Notes on Democracy,Mencken, H. L. Notes on Democracy, Alfred A. Knopf. New York, 1926.
 Michels, Steven . The Case against Democracy, Praeger, 2013.
 Newcastle, Lord Percy of. The Heresy of Democracy, Henry Regnery Co, 1955.
 Nickerson, Hoffman. "Democracy and Mass Massacre," The American Mercury, April 1932.
 Pobedonostsev, Konstantin P. Reflections of a Russian Statesman, Grant Richards. London, 1898.
 Schmitt, Carl. The Crisis of Parliamentary Democracy, MIT Press, 1988.
 Scruton, Roger. "Limits to Democracy," The New Criterion, Vol. XXIV, No. 5, January 2006.
 Stanton, Stephen Berrien. "The Dangers of Democracy," The Bookman, Vol. XLVI, September 1917.
 Van Reybrouck, David  Against Elections: The Case for Democracy (2016) 
 Wood, James N. Democracy and the Will to Power, Alfred A. Knopf. New York, 1921.

Other

 Algoud, François-Marie. De la Démocratie à la Démoncratie, ou la Mort Programmée, Éditions de Chiré, 2008.
 Baumier, Matthieu. La Démocratie Totalitaire: Penser la Modernité Post-Démocratique, Presses de la Renaissance, 2007.
 Caponnetto, Antonio. La Perversión Democrática, Editorial Santiago Apóstol, 2008.
 d’Andigné, Amédée. L’Équivoque Démocratique, Au Fil d’Ariane, 1963.
 Fromentoux,  Michel. L’Illusion Démocratique, Nouvelles Éditions Latines, 1975.
 Haupt, Jean. Le Procès de la Démocratie, Cahiers découvertes, 1971.
 Madiran, Jean. Les Deux Démocraties, Nouvelles Éditions Latines, 1977.
 Montejano, Bernardino. La Democracia Según el Magisterio de la Iglesia, Buenos Aires, 1966.
 Popescu, Stan. Autopsia de la Democracia, Euthymia, 1984.
 Ramos, Fulvio. La Iglesia y la Democracia, Cruz y Fierro, 1984.

Democracy
Democracy
Global issues
Authoritarianism
Totalitarianism